Pyynikki Summer Theatre is an open-air theatre operating in Tampere, Finland, known especially for its revolving auditorium. It is one of the largest summer theatres in Finland and has been running uninterrupted longer than any other open-air theatre in the country.

The theatre was founded in 1948 and was originally named Tampereen kesäteatteri (Tampere Summer Theatre). It started operating in Joselininniemi, on the shore of the lake Pyhäjärvi, where the performances continue to be held until today. In 1955 the name of the theatre was changed to Pyynikin kesäteatteri.

The theatre increased its popularity throughout the latter half of the 1950s. The construction of the rotating auditorium, designed by the architect Reijo Ojanen and holding 800 seats, was completed in 1959. The real breakthrough for Pyynikki Summer Theatre came in the 1960s with the play Tuntematon sotilas (The Unknown Soldier). This stage adaptation of the novel by Väinö Linna became hugely popular and remained in the repertoire for nearly a decade.

The revolving auditorium was fully renovated in the mid-1990s, when the number of seats was increased to 836. Since January 2001, the theatre has been run by Pyynikin Kesäteatterisäätiö (Pyynikki Summer Theatre Foundation). In 2005 a roof for the auditorium was completed, thus lengthening the usability of the theatre in spring and autumn in the Nordic weather conditions.

Tampereen Teatterikerho, which managed the theatre before the foundation was formed, has been an important influence in the cultural life of Tampere, because its support enabled the founding of Tampere Theatre Festival (Tampereen Teatterikesä) in 1969 and Teatteri 2000 in 1985.

Repertoire 
The repertoire of Pyynikki Summer Theatre has from the beginning consisted mainly of Finnish drama and comedy. Among others, works by Aleksis Kivi, Minna Canth, Johannes Linnankoski, Joel Lehtonen, Maiju Lassila, Maria Jotuni, Jalmari Finne, Väinö Linna, Kalle Päätalo and Hella Wuolijoki have been adapted for the Pyynikki stage. Of international classics, plays by William Shakespeare have been the most often performed.

The best-known and most successful play in Pyynikki Summer Theatre has been Tuntematon sotilas by Väinö Linna, directed by Edvin Laine. It premiered in 1961 and continued to be performed for nine summers. A total of 348,854 people saw the play. In the 1970s the most viewed productions were Ihmisiä kairassa by Kalle Päätalo, directed by Edvin Laine (1977) and Ihmisiä suviyössä by F.E. Sillanpää, directed by Rauli Lehtonen (1978). The biggest box office successes of the 1980s in Pyynikki were A Midsummer Night's Dream by William Shakespeare, directed by Jiří Menzel, and Kätkäläinen by Simo Hämäläinen, directed by Markku Onttonen. The latter made Pyynikin Kesäteatteri the 7th biggest theatre in Finland.

The repertoire of the 1990s was structured around Akseli ja Elina and Täällä Pohjantähden alla (Under the North Star), both based on novels by Väinö Linna, as well as a new version of Tuntematon sotilas. These were all directed by Kalle Holmberg. In the 2000s, the emphasis has been on comedy and plays featuring plenty of Finnish popular music.

Plays performed in Pyynikki Summer Theatre 1990-2007
1990  Hugo Raudsepp: Puolimatka pulassa
1991  Maiju Lassila: Kilpakosijat
1992  Tauno Yliruusu: Kesäillan valssi
1993–94  Väinö Linna: Akseli ja Elina
1995–96  Väinö Linna: Täällä Pohjantähden alla (Under the North Star)
1997  Väinö Linna: Tuntematon sotilas (The Unknown Soldier)
1998  Laila Hietamies: Maan kämmenellä
1999  Lars Hulden & Sven Sid: Kesäpäivä Kangasalla
2000  Kalle Päätalo: Pohjalta ponnistaen
2001  Agapetus: Aatamin puvussa ja vähän Eevankin
2002  Heikki Luoma: Vain muutaman huijarin tähden
2003  Heikki Vihinen: Hopeinen kuu
2004  Jukka Virtanen: Albatrossi ja Heiskanen
2005  Johannes Linnankoski: Tulipunakukka
2006  Veikko Huovinen: Lampaansyöjät (The Sheep Eaters)
2007  Heikki Luoma: Mooseksen perintö
2008  Timo Kahilainen ja Heikki Vihinen: Kalliolle kukkulalle
2009  Hella Wuolijoki & Bertolt Brecht: Iso-Heikkilän isäntä ja hänen renkinsä Kalle
2010  Anna-Leena Härkönen: Häräntappoase
2011  Paavo Haavikko: Rauta-aika
2012  Suokas-Syrjä-Vihinen: Kuuma kesä '85
2013  Suokas-Syrjä-Vihinen: Kuuma kesä '85
2014  Heikki Luoma: Pirunpelto
2015  Veera Nieminen: Avioliittosimulaattori

Further reading 
 Rauli Lehtonen & Heikki Haukka: Pyörivä kansanjuhla. Tampereen Teatterikerho, 1997.

External links 
Official website for Pyynikki Summer Theatre

Theatres in Finland
Buildings and structures in Tampere
Tourist attractions in Tampere
Pyynikki